In geometry, the Möbius–Kantor polygon is a regular complex polygon 3{3}3, in . 3{3}3 has 8 vertices, and 8 edges. It is self-dual. Every vertex is shared by 3 triangular edges. Coxeter named it a Möbius–Kantor polygon for sharing the complex configuration structure as the Möbius–Kantor configuration, (83).

Discovered by G.C. Shephard in 1952, he represented it as 3(24)3, with its symmetry, Coxeter called as 3[3]3, isomorphic to the binary tetrahedral group, order 24.

Coordinates

where .

As a Configuration
The configuration matrix for 3{3}3 is:

Real representation 
It has a real representation as the 16-cell, in 4-dimensional space, sharing the same 8 vertices. The 24 edges in the 16-cell are seen in the Möbius–Kantor polygon when the 8 triangular edges are drawn as 3-separate edges. The triangles are represented 2 sets of 4 red or blue outlines. The B4 projections are given in two different symmetry orientations between the two color sets.

Related polytopes

The truncation , is the same as the regular polygon, 3{6}2, . Its edge-diagram is the cayley diagram for 3[3]3.

The regular Hessian polyhedron 3{3}3{3}3,  has this polygon as a facet and vertex figure.

Notes

References
 Shephard, G.C.; Regular complex polytopes, Proc. London math. Soc. Series 3, Vol 2, (1952), pp 82–97.
 Coxeter, H. S. M. and Moser, W. O. J.; Generators and Relations for Discrete Groups (1965), esp pp 67–80.
 Coxeter, H. S. M.; Regular Complex Polytopes, Cambridge University Press, (1974), second edition (1991).
 Coxeter, H. S. M. and Shephard, G.C.; Portraits of a family of complex polytopes, Leonardo Vol 25, No 3/4, (1992), pp 239–244 

Polytopes
Complex analysis